Malambo is a constituency of the National Assembly of Zambia. in Mambwe District of Eastern Province. In 2021 it had 45,130 registered voters in 15 wards; Chikowa, Chipako, Chipapa, Chisengu, Jumbe, Kakumbi, Kasamanda, Malama, Mdima, Mnkhanya, Mphomwa, Msoro, Ncheka, Nsefu and Nyakatokoli.

List of MPs

References

Constituencies of the National Assembly of Zambia
1968 establishments in Zambia
Constituencies established in 1968